Poland competed at the 1992 Winter Paralympics in Tignes/Albertville, France. 13 competitors from Poland won 5 medals, 2 gold and 3 bronze, and finished 10th in the medal table.

Medalists

Gold
 Jan Kołodziej - Cross-country skiing, Standing 5 km Individual Classic LW3/5/7/9
 Marcin Kos - Cross-country skiing, Standing 20 km Individual Free LW3/5/7/9

Bronze
 Jan Kołodziej - Cross-country skiing, Standing 20 km Individual Free LW3/5/7/9
 Andrzej Pietrzyk - Cross-country skiing, Standing 5 km Individual Classic LW6/8
 Jan Kołodziej, Marian Damian, Marcin Kos, Andrzej Pietrzyk - Cross-country skiing, Standing 4 x 5 km Relay LW2-9

Alpine skiing

Cross‑country skiing

See also 
 Poland at the Paralympics
 Poland at the 1992 Winter Olympics

References 

Poland at the Paralympics
1992 in Polish sport
Nations at the 1992 Winter Paralympics